Danilo Elvis Turcios Funez (born 8 May 1978 in Sonaguera, Honduras) is a Honduran former professional football player and current manager of Juticalpa F.C. in the Honduran second division.

He was a member of the national squad at the 2000 Summer Olympics in Sydney, Australia and the 2010 FIFA World Cup in South Africa.

Club career
Nicknamed el Enano (the Dwarf) because of his short build, Turcios began his professional career with Universidad of his native Honduras in 1996, making his debut in the 1997 Apertura, then he played with F.C. Motagua winning his first Honduran championship before moving to Deportivo Maldonado of Uruguay in 2001. After a year with Maldonado, he moved to Defensor Sporting, where he would last even less time, moving later in the year to Peñarol.

Turcios moved on to the Liga MX México Primera División in 2004, signing with Estudiantes Tecos. After one season with the Guadalajara-based club, he returned home to Honduras to play with Olimpia. Outside of a one-season stint with Guatemalan side Comunicaciones in 2006, Turcios was a regular fixture in Olimpia's line-up from 2005 to 2012.

He signed with Atlanta Silverbacks of the North American Soccer League in February 2012. He played the 2012 Apertura season for Real Sociedad but left the club claiming they ended his contract and demanding money. He did not plan to retire after the season, hinting to a return to Motagua, which was later denied by the club.

He finally joined Honduran second division side UPNFM for the 2013 Clausura.

International career
Turcios made his debut for Honduras in a November 1999 friendly match against Trinidad & Tobago and has earned a total of 87 caps, scoring 7 goals. He has represented his country in 33 FIFA World Cup qualification matches, at the 2000 Summer Olympics and the 2010 FIFA World Cup. He also played at the 2001 and 2009 UNCAF Nations Cups as well as at the 2000, 2003 and 2005 CONCACAF Gold Cups. Also, he played at the 2001 Copa América.

His final international appearance was a June 2010 FIFA World Cup match against Switzerland.

Managerial career

Juticalpa F.C.
On 8 July 2019, it was reported that Turcios was named head coach of Juticalpa F.C. in the Honduran second division.

Career statistics

International goals

Honours and awards

Club
CD Olimpia
Honduran Liga Nacional (7): 2004–05 C, 2005–06 A, 2005–06 C, 2007–08 C, 2008–09 C, 2009–10 C, 2011–12 A

F.C. Motagua
Honduran Liga Nacional (1): 2001–02 A

Country
Honduras
CONCACAF Men's Olympic Qualifying Tournament (1): 2000

References

External links
 
 
 World Cup Profile – FIFA
 Dani Turcios: “A EEUU jamás se le puede dar por muerto” (interview and profile) – Tiempo 

1978 births
Living people
People from Colón Department (Honduras)
Association football fullbacks
Association football wingers
Honduran footballers
Honduras international footballers
Olympic footballers of Honduras
Footballers at the 2000 Summer Olympics
2000 CONCACAF Gold Cup players
2001 UNCAF Nations Cup players
2001 Copa América players
2003 CONCACAF Gold Cup players
2005 CONCACAF Gold Cup players
2009 UNCAF Nations Cup players
2010 FIFA World Cup players
F.C. Motagua players
Deportivo Maldonado players
Defensor Sporting players
Peñarol players
Tecos F.C. footballers
C.D. Olimpia players
Comunicaciones F.C. players
Atlanta Silverbacks players
C.D. Real Sociedad players
Lobos UPNFM players
Juticalpa F.C. managers
Honduran expatriate footballers
Expatriate footballers in Uruguay
Expatriate footballers in Mexico
Expatriate footballers in Guatemala
Expatriate soccer players in the United States
Liga Nacional de Fútbol Profesional de Honduras players
Liga MX players
Uruguayan Primera División players
North American Soccer League players
Pan American Games silver medalists for Honduras
Footballers at the 1999 Pan American Games
Medalists at the 1999 Pan American Games
Pan American Games medalists in football